Paul S. Stull (born May 8, 1936) is an American politician and was member of the Maryland House of Delegates.

Background
Paul Stull was first elected to the Maryland House of Delegates in 1995 to represent District 4A, which covers Frederick County, Maryland.  He defeated incumbent Thomas H. Hattery.  He  served District 4A along with Joseph R. Bartlett.

Education
Stull graduated from the University of Maryland in 1964 with his B.S. degree in Agriculture.  He later received his M.S. degree in 1964 from West Virginia University.

Career
Stull served as a teacher and principal for 25 years.  From 1968-1974 he was an adult education instructor with Frederick County Public Schools. He was later the Principal of the Frederick County Career and Technology Center from 1976-88. Later, he was an instructor at Frederick Community College from 1982-85. Finally, he served as Coordinator of school construction from 1988-92 for Frederick County Public Schools.

Legislative notes
voted against the Clean Indoor Air Act of 2007 (HB359)
 voted against in-state tuition for illegal immigrants in 2007 (HB6)
 voted against the Healthy Air Act in 2006 (SB154)
 voted for slots in 2005 (HB1361)
voted for income tax reduction in 1998 (SB750)

Election results

2006 Race for Maryland House of Delegates – District 4A
Voters to choose two:
{| class="wikitable"
|-
!Name
!Votes
!Percent
!Outcome
|-
|-
|Joseph R. Bartlett, Rep.
|16,545
|  36.8%
|   Won
|-
|-
|-
|Paul S. Stull, Rep
|17,765
|  39.5%
|   Won
|-
|-
|Maggi Margaret Hays, Dem
|10,519
|  23.4%
|   Lost
|-
|Other Write-Ins
|140
|  0.3%
|   Lost
|}

2002 Race for Maryland House of Delegates – District 4A
Voters to choose two:
{| class="wikitable"
|-
!Name
!Votes
!Percent
!Outcome
|-
|-
|Joseph R. Bartlett, Rep.
|14,720
|  31.7%
|   Won
|-
|-
|-
|Paul S. Stull, Rep
|16,830
|  36.3%
|   Won
|-
|-
|Valerie Moore Dale, Dem
|7,399
|  15.9%
|   Lost
|-
|-
|Dick Franklin, Dem
|6,001
|  12.9%
|   Lost
|-
|-
|Louise Virginia Snodgrass, Rep Write-In
|1,472
|  3.2%
|   Lost
|}

1998 Race for Maryland House of Delegates – District 4A
Voters to choose two:
{| class="wikitable"
|-
!Name
!Votes
!Percent
!Outcome
|-
|-
|David R. Brinkley, Rep.
|15,383
|  39%
|   Won
|-
|-
|-
|Paul S. Stull, Rep
|14,559
|  37%
|   Won
|-
|-
|Valerie M. Hertges, Dem
|9,892
|  25%
|   Lost
|}

1994 Race for Maryland House of Delegates – District 4A
Voters to choose two:
{| class="wikitable"
|-
!Name
!Votes
!Percent
!Outcome
|-
|-
|David R. Brinkley, Rep.
|12,296
|  31%
|   Won
|-
|-
|-
|Paul S. Stull, Rep
|11,789
|  30%
|   Won
|-
|-
|Thomas H. Hattery, Dem
|9,900
|  25%
|   Lost
|-
|-
|Thomas Gordon Slater, Dem
|5,785
|  15%
|   Lost
|}

References

External links
http://www.msa.md.gov/msa/mdmanual/06hse/html/msa12310.html
http://www.elections.state.md.us/elections/1990/results_1990/gahod.html

1936 births
Republican Party members of the Maryland House of Delegates
People from Frederick County, Maryland
University of Maryland, College Park alumni
West Virginia University alumni
Living people
21st-century American politicians